The 1928 New Mexico Lobos football team represented the University of New Mexico as an independent during the 1928 college football season. In their ninth season under head coach Roy W. Johnson, the Lobos compiled a 5–2–1 record. 

Those streaks remain the longest in school history.

In the team's October 6 victory over Montezuma College, M. Nelson set a school record with a 95-yard interception return. Nelson's return remains the fourth longest in school history through the end of the 2017 season.

Halfback John Dolzadelli and guard John P. "Jack" McFarland were the team captains. Dolzadelli was invited to play in the East–West Shrine Game at the end of the 1928 season; he was the first New Mexico player to be so honored.

Schedule

References

New Mexico
New Mexico Lobos football seasons
New Mexico Lobos football